Sam Harding is an Australian Paralympic athlete .  His classification is T12 and competes in 400m and the 800m events. He represented Australia at the 2020 Summer Paralympics, his second Games.

Personal
Harding was born in Perth on 11 May 1991. He has a visual impairment called choroideremia, which is a hereditary condition and has resulted in him losing most of his peripheral vision.  Harding attended Wesley College in Perth where he competed in rowing and completed a course in massage therapy.

Sporting career
Harding began his sporting career as a tandem cyclist competing for Western Australia.

Athletics 
He then switched to running after winning three gold medals, in the 400m, 800m and 1500m, at the 2009 Paralympic Youth Games in Melbourne. After this success, Harding was recognised by the Australian Paralympic Committee's Paralympic Talent Search Program and fast-tracked into a talent development camp held in Canberra.

Between 2010 and 2012, Harding received a dAIS scholarship and moved to the Australian Institute of Sport to train. 

In 2010, Harding competed in the 2010 national championships where he won bronze in the 800m. He was then selected to represent Australia at the 2011 International Paralympic Committee Athletics World Championships, in Christchurch, where he achieved a personal best and German Nationals where he finished fifth in both 800m events. 
 
Harding was selected to represent Australia at the 2012 Summer Paralympic Games. However, he fell ill prior to his event, the T13 800m, and was unable to compete. 
 
He competed at the 91st and 92nd Australian Athletics Championships where he won silver in the men's 800m and 400m respectively.
 
In 2015, Harding won silver in the Men's 400m at the 2015 IPC Athletics Grand Prix held in Brisbane.
 
At the 2020 Summer Paralympics in the Men's 1500 m T13, he finished eleventh.

He was coached by Iryna Dvoskina but currently is coached by Philo Saunders at the Australian Institute of Sport in Canberra.

Triathlon 
At the 2022 Commonwealth Games in Birmingham, England with guide Luke Harvey, he won the silver medal in the Men's PTVI.

Recognition
2022 - Canberra Sports Awards - Para Athlete of the Year

References

External links

 
 

Paralympic athletes of Australia
Living people
1991 births
Athletes (track and field) at the 2012 Summer Paralympics
Athletes (track and field) at the 2020 Summer Paralympics
Western Australian Institute of Sport alumni
Australian male middle-distance runners
20th-century Australian people
21st-century Australian people
Australian male triathletes
Commonwealth Games medallists in triathlon
Commonwealth Games silver medallists for Australia
Triathletes at the 2022 Commonwealth Games
People educated at Wesley College, Perth
Competitors in athletics with a visual impairment
Sportspeople from Perth, Western Australia
Sportsmen from Western Australia
Medallists at the 2022 Commonwealth Games